Lázaro Martínez Santray (born 3 November 1997) is a Cuban athlete who specialises in the triple jump and the long jump. He is a former World Junior Championship record holder for the triple jump with an attempt of 17.13 m jumped at the 2014 edition in Eugene, Oregon, and also holds the former world youth best in the triple jump, with an attempt of 17.24 m jumped in Havana.

Early life
Martínez was born to former 400 metres runner Isabel Contreras. He initially practised several sports, including basketball and judo, until he was about 10 years old. It was his mother who encouraged him to take up athletics and linked him up with a friend and coach.

Martínez has stated that he initially did not like athletics, but after doing a test with the said coach he was told he had the potential to enter the provincial sports school. He began specialising in the jumps under the supervision of coach Manuel Guilarte, whom he credits for instilling in him the love of athletics.

Career
At the 2013 World Youth Championships in Donetsk, Martínez equalled the World Youth Championship record set by compatriot Héctor Dairo Fuentes in 2005 with an attempt of 16.63 m in the fourth round, earning him his first major gold medal.

Martínez's record-breaking continued into 2014, as he jumped a world youth best of 17.24 m in front of a home crowd in the Cuban capital Havana. He then broke the World Junior Championship record twice at the 2014 World Junior Championships in Eugene, Oregon, jumping 17.08 m with a 0.6 m/s headwind on his first attempt and 17.13 m with a 0.7 m/s headwind on his second attempt. He became the fourth Cuban world junior champion in the triple jump after Yoelbi Quesada in 1992, René Hernández in 1996, Arnie David Giralt in 2002 and Pedro Pablo Pichardo in 2012.

Personal bests

Achievements

1No mark in the final

References

External links
 
 Lázaro Martínez at All-Athletics.com
 Tilastopaja biography

1997 births
Living people
Sportspeople from Guantánamo
Cuban male triple jumpers
Athletes (track and field) at the 2016 Summer Olympics
Olympic athletes of Cuba
Olympic male triple jumpers
Central American and Caribbean Games silver medalists for Cuba
Competitors at the 2014 Central American and Caribbean Games
Central American and Caribbean Games medalists in athletics
World Athletics Indoor Championships winners
World Athletics Indoor Championships medalists